There are over 98,000 Chinese citizens and nationals who live in Bangladesh. Most Chinese expatriates are based in Dhaka and Chittagong, and consist largely of diplomats or employees of foreign companies.

Chinese food enjoys large popularity and is widespread in Bangladesh, with there even being Bangladeshi-style Chinese cuisine. Chinese women in Dhaka have a reputation for running popular beauty parlours. 

Social and cultural events such as the Mid-Autumn Festival and the Chinese New Year are celebrated quite often by those who cannot go home. There is also a local organisation, Bangladesh-China People's Friendship Association (BCPFA), which has been active since 1986.

See also
 Bangladesh – People's Republic of China relations

Related immigration articles:
 Burmese Chinese
 Chinese people in Pakistan
 Chinese people in Sri Lanka

References

External links
 Interview: "Friendship Messenger" between peoples of Bangladesh, China

Bangladesh
Chinese diaspora in Asia
Ethnic groups in Bangladesh
Bangladesh–China relations